Live at the Fillmore is a live album by American band Cypress Hill. It was recorded at The Fillmore in San Francisco on August 16, 2000 and released on December 12, 2000 through Ruffhouse/Columbia Records. Production was handled by member DJ Muggs. It contains several songs performed from the group's previous studio albums: Cypress Hill, Black Sunday, IV and Skull & Bones with the exception for the songs from III: Temples of Boom. It features contributions from members of SX-10. In the United States, the album peaked at No. 119 on the Billboard 200 and No. 72 on the Top R&B/Hip-Hop Albums. It also reached No. 47 in Austria and No. 82 in Switzerland.

Reception

Rolling Stone - 3.5 stars out of 5 - "B-Real, Sen Dog, Bobo and DJ Muggs are in top form here."
Q magazine - 3 out of 5 stars - "Captures [them] in somewhat ebullient mood…on the pumped and primed beats…they sound at their most relaxed and…their most potent."
Melody Maker - 4 stars out of 5 - "Intense lunacy and sonic dementia.… It must've been mad - absolutely insane."
NME - 7 out of 10 - "The frenzy of the crowd feeds back into the immediacy of the performance and - Boom Shanka! And there are moments of such delicious madness here."

Track listing

Sample credits
Track 3 contains a sample of "Tramp" composed by Louis Fulson and Jimmy McCracklin

Personnel

Louis "B-Real" Freese – vocals
Senen "Sen Dog" Reyes – vocals
Lawrence "DJ Muggs" Muggerud – arranger, producer, mixing
Eric "Bobo" Correa – drums
Andy Zambrano – guitar (tracks: 6-12, 16, 17)
Jeremy Fleener – guitar (tracks: 6-12, 16, 17)
Frank Mercurio – bass (tracks: 6-12, 16, 17)
Troy Staton – mixing, live mobile recording
Richard McKernan – live mobile recording
Doug Field – live mobile recording assistant
Jay Resnick – live mobile recording assistant
Phil Kneebone – live mobile recording assistant
Mike Gonzales – live board engineer
Westwood One – mobile recording
Brian "Big Bass" Gardner – mastering
Arlene Owseichik – art direction
Estevan "Scandalous" Oriol – design, photography
Mark "Mr. Cartoon" Machado – design
Sonny Gerasimowicz – design
D. Sean MacDonald – artwork
Gerard Babitts – A&R
Paul D. Rosenberg – management
Cara Lewis – booking
Scott Thomas – booking
Jim Halogen – booking
Theo Sedlmayr – legal
Paul Furedi – editing

Charts

References

External links

2000 live albums
Cypress Hill albums
Albums produced by DJ Muggs
Columbia Records live albums
Ruffhouse Records live albums
Albums recorded at the Fillmore